Bangkok Christian College Football Club is a Thai defunct football club based in Bangkok. The name is derived from the Bangkok Christian College.

In 2018, the club was suspended because it fail to pass its licensing process to play in the 2018 Thai League 4 Bangkok Metropolitan Region. The team was banned 2 years and relegated to the 2020 Thailand Amateur League Bangkok Metropolitan Region.

In 2018, this club was appeal FA Thailand and pass to join 2018 Thailand Amateur League Bangkok Metropolitan Region.

Stadium and locations

Season by season record

P = Played
W = Games won
D = Games drawn
L = Games lost
F = Goals for
A = Goals against
Pts = Points
Pos = Final position

QR1 = First Qualifying Round
QR2 = Second Qualifying Round
R1 = Round 1
R2 = Round 2
R3 = Round 3
R4 = Round 4

R5 = Round 5
R6 = Round 6
QF = Quarter-finals
SF = Semi-finals
RU = Runners-up
W = Winners

Achievements
Thailand Division 1 League: Winner 2001, Runners-up 2000

References

External links
 Official Website

 
Football clubs in Thailand
Sport in Bangkok
Association football clubs established in 1997
1997 establishments in Thailand
University and college association football clubs